Jesús Navas (born 3 August 1953) is a Venezuelan boxer. He competed in the men's light welterweight event at the 1976 Summer Olympics.

References

1953 births
Living people
Venezuelan male boxers
Olympic boxers of Venezuela
Boxers at the 1976 Summer Olympics
Boxers at the 1975 Pan American Games
Pan American Games bronze medalists for Venezuela
Pan American Games medalists in boxing
Place of birth missing (living people)
Light-welterweight boxers
Medalists at the 1975 Pan American Games
20th-century Venezuelan people